Ritva Salonen (28 February 1936 – 28 March 1996) was a Finnish gymnast. She competed in six events at the 1960 Summer Olympics.

References

1936 births
1996 deaths
Finnish female artistic gymnasts
Olympic gymnasts of Finland
Gymnasts at the 1960 Summer Olympics
Gymnasts from Tampere
20th-century Finnish women